Skoparnik Bluff is the partly ice-free bluff rising to 882 m in the northeast foothills of Detroit Plateau on Trinity Peninsula in Graham Land, Antarctica.  It is surmounting Victory Glacier to the southeast.

The feature is named after Skoparnik Peak on Vitosha Mountain in Western Bulgaria.

Location
German-British mapping in 1996.

Maps
 Trinity Peninsula. Scale 1:250000 topographic map No. 5697. Institut für Angewandte Geodäsie and British Antarctic Survey, 1996.
 Antarctic Digital Database (ADD). Scale 1:250000 topographic map of Antarctica. Scientific Committee on Antarctic Research (SCAR). Since 1993, regularly updated.

Notes

References
 Skoparnik Bluff. SCAR Composite Antarctic Gazetteer
 Bulgarian Antarctic Gazetteer. Antarctic Place-names Commission. (details in Bulgarian, basic data in English)

External links
 Skoparnik Bluff. Copernix satellite image

Cliffs of Graham Land
Landforms of Trinity Peninsula
Bulgaria and the Antarctic